The third season of S.W.A.T. premiered on CBS on October 2, 2019 and concluded on May 20, 2020. The series moved to Wednesday at 10:00 p.m. after SEAL Team. Only 21 episodes were produced due to the COVID-19 pandemic in the United States. The season is produced by CBS Television Studios.

Cast and characters

Main 
 Shemar Moore as Sergeant II Daniel "Hondo" Harrelson Jr.
 Alex Russell as Officer III James "Jim" Street
 Lina Esco as Officer III Christina "Chris" Alonso
 Kenny Johnson as Officer III+1 Dominique Luca 
 David Lim as Officer III Victor Tan
 Patrick St. Esprit as Commander Robert Hicks
 Amy Farrington as Lieutenant Detective Piper Lynch
 Jay Harrington as Sergeant II David "Deacon" Kay

Recurring 
 Louis Ferreira as Buck Spivey
 Lou Ferrigno Jr. as Donovan Rocker
 Obba Babatundé as Daniel Harrelson Sr.
 Gabrielle Dennis as Briana Harrelson
 DeShae Frost as Darryl Henderson
 Otis "Odie" Gallop as Sergeant Stevens
 Laura James as Molly Hicks
 Juan Javier Cardenas as Beni
 Michael Marc Friedman as Sergeant Becker
 Rochelle Aytes as Nichelle Carmichael

Guest 
 Bre Blair as Annie Kay
 Debbie Allen as Charice Harrelson
 Nikiva Dionne as Nia Wells
 Amanda Lowe-Oadell as Lilia Kay
 Cory Hardrict as Nate Warren
 Bailey Chase as Owen Bennett
 Jackson Hurst as Ben Sikora
 David Gallagher as Sawyer
 Michael O'Neill as Carl Luca

Episodes

Production 
On May 9, 2019, CBS renewed the series for a third season, which premiered on October 2, 2019.

On March 16, 2020, Sony Pictures Television suspended production of the third season due to the COVID-19 pandemic.

Ratings

Home media

References

External links

2019 American television seasons
2020 American television seasons
Television productions suspended due to the COVID-19 pandemic